The Panamanian ambassador in Beijing is the official representative of the Government in Panama City to the Government of the People's Republic of China. Between 1949 and 2017, Panama did not have relations with the People's Republic of China, instead recognising Taiwan.

List of representatives

References

Ambassadors of Panama to China
China
Panama